The Krays: Dead Man Walking is a British crime drama film written and directed by Richard John Taylor and starring Rita Simons, Josh Myers, Christopher Ellison and Guy Henry. It was released on 10 September 2018.

Cast
 Rita Simons as Lisa Prescott
 Josh Myers as Frank Mitchell
 Christopher Ellison as Albert Donoghue
 Guy Henry as Lord Boothby
 Nicholas Ball as Harry Webster
 Jeanine Nerissa Sothcott as Valerie Fiske
 Leslie Grantham as Nipper Read
 Marc Pickering as Reggie Kray
 Nathanjohn Carter as Ronnie Kray
 Triana Terry as Frances Kray
 Charlie Woodward as Teddy Smith
 Darren Day as Don Dunn
 Linda Lusardi as Sally Mitchell
 Steve Wraith as Hartnell Harris
 Lowri Watts-Joyce as Mavis Mortimer
 Lacey Bond as Petula Watts

Release
The film was released on 10 September 2018 by Sony Pictures and was the biggest first week on DVD of any non-theatrical British film that year.

Reception
On: Yorkshire Magazine said, "The movie doesn’t outstay its welcome, and while it obviously won’t be for all tastes, if you like Brit indie gangster flicks with a mean streak, this certainly passes the time, even if it does feel like a feature-length teaser for something bigger."

Sequel
Due to the success of the film, writer and director Richard John Taylor announced a sequel, entitled The Krays: New Blood that would see Marc Pickering and Nathanjohn Carter, Nicholas Ball, Josh Myers and Triana Terry reprise their roles and that it would focus on the death of Reggie’s wife Frances Kray, and the possibility that Ronnie may have played a role in her death. It is set to be released in 2021, although this may be pushed back due to the coronavirus.

References

External links
 

2018 films
2018 crime drama films
British crime drama films
2010s English-language films
2010s British films